Pohick is an unincorporated community in Fairfax County, Virginia, United States. Pohick is centered between the intersections of Rolling and Telegraph Roads with Richmond Highway (U.S. Highway 1). It is adjacent to the communities of Lorton and Newington. Pohick takes its name from Pohick Church which in turn is named for Pohick Creek.

References

Unincorporated communities in Fairfax County, Virginia
Unincorporated communities in Virginia
Washington metropolitan area